Lynn Chircop (born 1980, in Santa Venera, Malta) is a Maltese singer and television presenter, who won the Maltese national final for the Eurovision Song Contest 2003 in Latvia with the song To Dream Again.

References 

1980 births
Living people
21st-century Maltese women singers
21st-century Maltese singers
Eurovision Song Contest entrants for Malta
Eurovision Song Contest entrants of 2003